Alex Robert Joers (born 1992) is an American communications professional and Democratic politician from Dane County, Wisconsin.  He is a member of the Wisconsin State Assembly, representing Wisconsin's 79th Assembly district since January 2023.  He is also currently a member of the Dane County board of supervisors.

Biography
Alex Joers was born in Madison, Wisconsin, and moved to the neighboring city of Middleton as a child.  He graduated from Middleton High School and earned his bachelor's degree in political science and public administration in 2015 from the University of Wisconsin–La Crosse.  While in high school, Joers was a cross country athlete and for many years taught classes at the gym owned by his parents.  Since 2022, he has also been employed as a program manager for AMPED Association Management, a company which provides management services to non-profits.  Joers' clients include the Society for Research on Adolescence and the American Physical Therapy Association.

Political career
Joers' political activities began while in college, when he worked on campus get out the vote projects.  After graduating from college, he was employed as a legislative aide to state senator Jennifer Shilling and state representative Melissa Agard.  He then worked in fundraising for the Wisconsin State Senate Democratic Committee, and joined state senator Julie Lassa's 2016 re-election campaign.  After the 2016 election, he became a full time legislative aide to state representative Dianne Hesselbein, and then in 2019 he was promoted to Hesselbein's communications and policy aide.

In 2020, Joers ran for his first public office, under the auspices of the national Run for Something campaign which seeks to get more young candidates to run for public office.  He was unopposed running for the Dane County board of supervisors in an open seat and was re-elected without opposition in 2022.

In December 2021, Dianne Hesselbein announced she would run for Wisconsin State Senate in 2022, and would therefore not run for re-election in Wisconsin's 79th Assembly district.  Just after the Spring election in 2022, Joers announced his campaign for the now-open Assembly seat.  He also later said that he was inspired to run for the office, in part, by the outpouring of support from the Middleton community after the death of his father.  He defeated Madison small business owner Brad Votava in the Democratic primary, with 76% of the vote.  In the general election, he faced Waunakee nurse Victoria Fueger, who had also run as the Republican candidate in 2020.  Joers prevailed with 74% of the vote in the heavily Democratic district.  
 
He will assume office in January 2023.

Personal life and family
Alex Joers was the eldest of three children born to Bob and Cindy ( Reinerio) Joers of Milwaukee.  Bob Joers was athletic director at Middleton High School for many years.  The Joers established The Little Gym of Middleton—a franchise children's gymnastics and recreational facility—in 2004.  Bob Joers was a popular figure in the Middleton community; he died of pancreatic cancer in 2020.

Alex Joers married Kathryn "Katie" Sikora in Windsor, Wisconsin, in 2018. They live in Madison, Wisconsin, with their 2-year-old son.  Alex and Katie met while students at the University of Wisconsin–La Crosse.

Electoral history

Wisconsin Assembly (2022)

| colspan="6" style="text-align:center;background-color: #e9e9e9;"| Democratic Primary, August 9, 2022

| colspan="6" style="text-align:center;background-color: #e9e9e9;"| General Election, November 8, 2022

References

External links
 Campaign website
 Official (county) website
 
 Alex Joers at Wisconsin Vote
 Alex Joers at LegiStorm
 The Little Gym of Middleton

1992 births
Living people
Democratic Party members of the Wisconsin State Assembly
People from Madison, Wisconsin
People from Middleton, Wisconsin
21st-century American politicians
County supervisors in Wisconsin
University of Wisconsin–La Crosse alumni
Legislative staff